The 1984 Hardy Cup was the 1984 edition of the Canadian intermediate senior ice hockey championship.

Final
Best of 7
Moose Jaw 5 Charlottetown 4
Charlottetown  7 Moose Jaw 3
Charlottetown 3 Moose Jaw 0
Charlottetown 6 Moose Jaw 1
Charlottetown 6 Moose Jaw 0
Charlottetown Islanders beat Moose Jaw Generals 4-1 on series.

External links
Hockey Canada

Hardy Cup
Hardy